Curtis Blair (born September 24, 1970, in Roanoke, Virginia) is a retired American professional basketball player and current referee in the National Basketball Association (NBA).

College
A 6'3" and 185 lb point guard, Blair played college basketball for the University of Richmond Spiders.  Blair was honored as the Colonial Athletic Association Men's Basketball Player of the Year in 1991–92 season, as well as a two-time first-team All-CAA and three-time CAA All-Tournament team selection.

NBA
He was selected by the Houston Rockets in the 2nd round (53rd overall) of the 1992 NBA Draft, though he never played in a regular-season game for the Rockets.

Following a brief career playing overseas including Turkey, Blair became a referee in the NBA, where he wears the number 74.

References

External links
 at TheDraftReview.com
  Referee Statistics

1970 births
Living people
20th-century African-American sportspeople
21st-century African-American sportspeople
African-American basketball players
African-American sports officials
American expatriate basketball people in Australia
American expatriate basketball people in Austria
American expatriate basketball people in Turkey
American men's basketball players
Basketball players from Virginia
Houston Rockets draft picks
National Basketball Association referees
Point guards
Sportspeople from Roanoke, Virginia
Richmond Spiders men's basketball players